Ryŏkp'o station is a railway station located in Ryŏkp'o-guyŏk, P'yŏngyang, North Korea. It is on located on the P'yŏngbu Line; it is also the starting point of the Rangrang Line.

References

Railway stations in North Korea